Haotouzhuang Hui Ethnic Township (Xiao'erjing: هَوْتِوْتُوْا خُوِذُو سِیْا) is an ethnic township under the administration of Dingzhou City in Hebei province, China, located about  southeast of downtown Dingzhou in the southern part of Baoding City. , it has 17 villages under its administration.

See also 
 List of township-level divisions of Hebei

References 

Township-level divisions of Hebei
Ethnic townships of the People's Republic of China